The Early Years:1990-1995 is a compilation album by The Casualties, released in 2001.

Track listing
Political Sin - 01:48
Destruction and Hate - 02:42
Ugly Bastards - 01:59
Bored and Glued - 01:40
Punk Rock Love - 02:00
40oz Casualties - 01:45
Oi! Song - 01:29
25 Years Too Late - 01:50
For the Punx - 02:43
Drinking is Our Way of Life - 02:29
Kill the Hippies - 01:30
No Life - 02:20
Two Faced - 01:56
Politicians - 02:16
Casualties - 01:44
Two Faced - 01:51
Fuck You All - 02:38

Bonus tracks 
On the Streets (live) - 02:42
Ugly Bastards (live) - 02:02
Blind Following (live) - 01:18
Washed Up (live) - 02:01
Don't Tell the Truth (live) - 01:19
Oi! Song (live) - 01:39
40oz Casualty (live) - 02:02
Rock and Roll Kids (live) - 01:28
Destruction and Hate (live) - 02:52
Punk Rock Love (live) - 01:58

References

1995 compilation albums
The Casualties albums